"Thank You" is the third single by heavy metal band Hellyeah from their debut album Hellyeah. The song is a tribute to all of the band's then-recently departed family members: Vinnie Paul's brother Dimebag Darrell, Tom Maxwell's mother, and Chad Gray's grandmother. The song reached number 37 on the Billboard Hot Mainstream Rock Tracks chart.

Personnel 
Hellyeah
Chad Gray – vocals
Greg Tribbett – guitar
Tom Maxwell – guitar
Jerry Montano – bass
Vinnie Paul – drums
Production
Produced, engineered, mixed, and mastered by Vinnie Paul and Sterling Winfield
Co-produced by Hellyeah
Additional guitar tracks recorded by Drew Mazurek

References 

2007 songs
2008 singles
Hellyeah songs
Epic Records singles
Songs written by Vinnie Paul
Songs written by Chad Gray
Songs written by Greg Tribbett
Songs written by Tom Maxwell
Alternative metal songs